Kōkee State Park is located in northwestern Kauai in the Hawaiian Islands. It includes the Kōkeʻe Museum at the  marker on State Road 550, which focuses on the weather, vegetation, and bird life; a lodge which serves food and sells gifts; cabins for rent; and hiking trails.

The main attractions of Kōkee State Park trails are the native vegetation, native forest birds, and the scenic cliffside views.

At the end of the state road is a lookout onto the Kalalau Valley, once home to thousands of native Hawaiians. The valley was the backdrop for Jack London's short story Koolau the Leper.

In October it is the home of a festival honoring Queen Emma of Hawaii.

Hiking trails

 Alakai Swamp Trail, length: . Trail through native wet forest to the rim of Wainiha Pali with sweeping view of the north shore. This birdwatching trail is often wet, slippery and muddy. The majority of this trail is a plank boardwalk covered with chicken wire to provide traction.
 Awaawapuhi Trail, length: . A trail with mesic and dryland native plants, it has views into the steep-sided Nualolo and Awaawapuhi Valleys.
 Berry Flat Trail, length: . This trail traverses a mix of planted alien and native forest types, including Coast Redwood (Sequoia sempervirens) and Sugi (Cryptomeria japonica) groves and disturbed koa/ōhia forest.
 Black Pipe Trail, length: . This trail is an alternate access to the Canyon Trail. Native hibiscus and iliau (Wilkesia gymnoxiphium) can be seen along the trail.
 Canyon Trail, length: . A trail with views of Waimea and Poomau Canyons. The trail follows the rim of Waimea Canyon and crosses Kōkee Stream.
 Cliff Trail, length: . A spur trail leading to a viewpoint of Waimea Canyon. Feral goats are often seen on the canyon walls.
 Ditch Trail, length: . A trail developed to construct and maintain the Kōkee Ditch. Vistas of surrounding forest and Poomau Stream.
 Faye Trail, length: . A short trail that accesses other trails in the Halemanu area.
 Halemanu-Kōkee Trail, length: . This trail wanders through somewhat disturbed koa/ōhia forest. Recovery from Hurricane Iwa and transition to koa forest from drier conditions is evident.
 Iliau Nature Loop, length: . Easy roadside nature trail through dry shrubland with plants identified. Sweeping views of Waimea Canyon and Waialae Canyon.
 Kaluapuhi Trail, length: . Disturbed ōhia montane mesic forest with some intact forest areas.
 Kukui Trail, Length: . Scenic, but steep trail into Waimea Canyon.
 Kumuwela Trail, length: . Mosaic of ōhia and koa/ōhia montane mesic forests with alien weed problems and hurricane damage.
 Nature Trail, length: . A starter trail to learn about native forest vegetation.
 Nualolo Trail, length: . Trail through koa/ōhia montane mesic forests and an aalii (Dodonaea viscosa) lowland dry shrubland with a view of Nualolo Valley.
 Pihea Trail, length: . A nature/birdwatching trail along the rim of Kalalau Valley, traversing ōhia montane wet forest.
 Puu ka Ohelo Trail, length: . Along this trail are examples of the impact that invasive alien weeds can have on native forest vegetation.
 Waininiua Trail, length: . A trail from which to see a relatively intact koa/ōhia montane mesic forest.
 Water Tank Trail, length: . This trail provides an example of a native koa/ōhia forest.

See also
Civilian Conservation Corps Camp in Koke'e State Park

References

External links

 Kōkee State Park
 Kōkee & Na Pali Coast Trail Guide
 Jack London's story Koolau the Leper - full text

State parks of Hawaii
Protected areas of Kauai